The Blue Line is a part of the Hyderabad Metro system in Telangana, India. The line is 27 km and spans 23 stations from Nagole to Raidurg. It was funded by a public–private partnership (PPP), with the state government holding a minority equity stake. A special purpose vehicle company, L&T Metro Rail Hyderabad Ltd (L&TMRHL), was established by the construction company Larsen & Toubro (L&T) to develop the Hyderabad Metro rail project.

The groundbreaking (Bhoomi Puja) for the project was conducted on 26 April 2012, and construction began with pillar erection on the same day. A  stretch of the Blue Line from Nagole to Ameerpet, with 14 stations, was inaugurated on 28 November 2017 by Prime Minister Narendra Modi, and opened to the public the next day The 10 km section between Ameerpet and HITEC City, with 8 stations, was opened on 20 March 2019. Three stations on the section were opened later. Peddamma Gudi, Madhapur, and Jubilee Hills Check Post were opened on 30 March, 13 April and 18 May 2019 respectively.

The final 1.5 km section from HITEC City to Raidurg was opened on 29 November 2019. Authorities decided not to construct the proposed Cyber Gateway station which would have been located between HITEC City to Raidurg stations because they felt that there was "too short a distance" between Cyber Gateway and the Raidurg terminus. As a result, the Blue Line has 23 stations instead of the originally proposed 24.

In phase 2, Hyderabad Airport will connected by metro from Raidurg metro station and the Blue Line is proposed to be extended by 5 km from Nagole to LB Nagar. Blue Line will further be extended by 800 metres for multi-level Raidurg station, from where Hyderabad Airport Metro Express will commence. The alignment to Shamshabad RGI Airport from the Raidurg metro station will be through  Khajaguda - Nanakramguda Road.

Construction
Blue Line sections were opened as indicated below.

Stations
There are 23 stations on the Blue Line. All stations are elevated.

See also
 Transport in Hyderabad
 List of Hyderabad Metro stations
 Yellow Line (Delhi Metro)

References

Hyderabad Metro